Karl Bruno Julius Mudra, from 1913 von Mudra (1 April 1851, in Bad Muskau – 21 November 1931, in Zippendorf) was a Prussian officer, and later General of Infantry during World War I. He was a recipient of Pour le Mérite with Oak Leaves.
Mudra married on 12 October 1886 in Rheydt Paula Schött (* 26 June 1860 in Rheydt – † 22 November 1937 in Schwerin), daughter of  Hermann Schött (owner of a big print shop) and  Sofie Wilhelmine Jansen. They had two children:
 Herbert Emil Bruno (1887–1945), Colonel
 Edith (1892–1942).

Honours
 :
 Iron Cross II Class (1870)
 Iron Cross I Class 
 Pour le Mérite (13 January 1915) and Oak Leaves (17 October 1916)

References

 Hanns Möller: Geschichte der Ritter des Ordens pour le mérite im Weltkrieg, Band II: M–Z, Verlag Bernard & Graefe, Berlin 1935

External links 
 Biography on "The Prussian Machine"

1851 births
1931 deaths
People from the Province of Brandenburg
German Army generals of World War I
Generals of Infantry (Prussia)
Recipients of the Pour le Mérite (military class)
Recipients of the Iron Cross (1870), 2nd class
Recipients of the Iron Cross (1914), 1st class
People from Bad Muskau
Recipients of the Order of the Medjidie, 1st class
Military personnel from Saxony